Panamá is a municipality in south Goiás state, Brazil.

Location
Panamá is located in the Meia Ponte Microregion and is about 25 kilometers north of the border with the state of Minas Gerais.  It is a short distance west of the important BR-153 highway which links São Paulo to Belém.  Panamá is 26 kilometers south of Goiatuba and 25 kilometers from Itumbiara.  The distance to Goiânia is 188 km.

Neighboring municipalities are:
north:  Goiatuba
south and west:  Itumbiara
east: Bom Jesus de Goiás

History
Panamá began with the building of a chapel by a local landowner.  In 1931 it became a district of Santa Rita do Paranaíba, present-day Itumbiara with the name Divinópolis.  In 1943 the name was changed to Panamá and Santa Rita changed to Itumbiara.  In 1950 it was dismembered from Itumbiara.  The name comes from a small river called Panamá.

Political Information
Mayor: Divino Alexandre da Silva (January 2013)
City council: 9

Demographics
Population density: 6.04 inhabitants/km2 (2007)
Urban population: 1,995 (2007)
Rural population: 623 (2007)
Population growth 2000-2007:  -0,83%

Economy
The economy is based on agriculture, cattle raising, services, public administration, and small transformation industries.  
Industrial units: 2 (2007)
Commercial units: 24 (2007)
Cattle herd: 27,800 head (2006)
Main crops (2006): cotton (700 hectares), rice (400 hectares), sugarcane, oranges, manioc, corn, and soybeans (5,700 hectares).
In 2006 there were 221 farmers with a planted area of 6,368 hectares.  The total agricultural area was 16,567 ha..  Pasture made up 9,290 ha.

Education
Schools: 3
Students: 795
Middle schools and students: 1 with 155 students
Higher education: none
Adult literacy rate: 81.9% (2000) (national average was 86.4%)

Health
Hospitals: 0
Hospital beds: 0
Ambulatory clinics: 1
Infant mortality rate: 23.05 (2000) (national average was 33.0)

The United Nations Human Development Index (2000) ranked Panamá 131 out of 242 municipalities in the state of Goiás with a score of 0.733.

For the complete list see Frigoletto

See also 
 List of municipalities in Goiás

References

Frigoletto
 Sepin

Municipalities in Goiás